Crash (also known as The Crash of Flight 401) is a 1978 made-for-TV drama film directed by Barry Shear and based on the true story of the first crash of a wide-body aircraft, that of Eastern Air Lines Flight 401, a Lockheed L-1011 TriStar which crashed in the Florida Everglades near Miami on the night of December 29, 1972.  The film more or less follows the true events of the crash, although the names of key characters were changed and certain dramatic events were fictionalized.  The crash sequence was one of the most authentic (and expensive) for television of the time, using multiple stunts, pyrotechnics and flyaway set pieces.

The film stars William Shatner as maverick National Transportation Safety Board crash investigator Carl Tobias, who is called in to review the jetliner crash under pressure from his superiors to exonerate Lockheed of responsibility.  Although the film implies that Lockheed was negligent in the design of the TriStar's flight control systems, it concludes by citing the NTSB's official determination that the crash was due to pilot error:  the crew's failure to properly monitor the flight instruments during the last four minutes of flight.  The crew was distracted by a blown light bulb in the landing gear position indicator display panel, which caused them not to notice that they had inadvertently disengaged the autopilot and put the TriStar into a slow, imperceptible descent.  Eddie Albert portrayed the captain, and Lane Smith, in an early role, portrayed the hospitalized and barely alive surviving flight engineer who alerts Tobias to a computer "mismatch" in the autopilot.  The cast also included Adrienne Barbeau and Sharon Gless, whose characters were based on the actual flight attendants tending to the passengers that fateful night.  Lorraine Gary, Ed Nelson, and Ron Glass played noteworthy passengers.

Cast
William Shatner - Carl Tobias
Eddie Albert - Captain Dunn
Adrienne Barbeau - Veronica Daniels 
Brooke Bundy - Camille Lawrence 
Christopher Connelly - Mike Tagliarino 
Lorraine Gary - Emily Mulwray 
Ron Glass - Jerry Grant 
Sharon Gless - Lesley Fuller 
Joyce Jameson - Sophie Cross 
George Maharis - Evan Walsh 
Ed Nelson - Philip Mulwray 
Gerald S. O'Loughlin - Larry Cross 
Joe Silver - Alvin Jessop 
Lane Smith - Flight Engineer Dominic Romano 
Laraine Stephens - Ginny Duffy 
Richard Yniguez - Osario

External links

The Crash of Eastern Airlines Flight 401

American docudrama films
1978 television films
1978 films
ABC network original films
American aviation films
Films about aviation accidents or incidents
1978 drama films
Films set in 1972
Films set in Florida
American drama television films
1970s American films